The Nicaraguan spider monkey (Ateles geoffroyi geoffroyi) is a subspecies of Geoffroy's spider monkey, a type of New World monkey, from Central America.  It is native to Nicaragua and parts of Costa Rica closest to Nicaragua plus the Guanacaste peninsula.  The population in Guanacaste and much of Nicaragua is sometimes considered to be a separate subspecies, A. g. frontatus.  But other authorities consider A. g. frontatus to be a synonym of A. g. geoffroyi.

Its arms, thighs, back and chest are grayish or brownish.  Its hands and feet are black.  Its elbows, knees, lower arms and legs may or may not be black.  It has a gold, yellow or buff abdomen and a black face with light eye rings.

It influences the tropical ecosystem structure and function through the creation of visible terrestrial latrines beneath their "sleeping sites" - trees in which they frequently return to sleep.

References

Spider monkeys
Primates of Central America
Mammals described in 1820
Taxa named by Heinrich Kuhl